Simsbury Center is a census-designated place (CDP) that consists of the central settlement, and the neighborhoods immediately surrounding it, in the town of Simsbury, Connecticut, in the United States. As of the 2010 census, the CDP had a population of 5,836. The core area of the CDP is listed as the Simsbury Center Historic District on the National Register of Historic Places.

Geography
The Simsbury Center CDP is bordered to the north by Hoskins Road, to the east by the former route of the New York, New Haven and Hartford Railroad, now partially replaced by a bike trail, to the south by Stratton Brook Road, and to the west by Bushy Hill Road, Hop Brook, Grimes Brook, Great Pond Road, and Laurel Lane. The CDP is bordered to the west by West Simsbury and to the south by Weatogue. The Farmington River flows northward just east of the CDP.

The main road through the community is the combined U.S. Route 202/Connecticut Route 10, which leads north to Granby and south to Avon. Connecticut Route 309 (West Street) leads west from Simsbury Center through West Simsbury to North Canton. Connecticut Route 167 (Bushy Hill Road) branches off Route 309 and leads southwest to Crowleys Corner at the border between Simsbury and Avon.

Demographics
As of the census of 2000, there were 5,603 people, 2,216 households, and 1,582 families residing in the CDP. The racial makeup of the CDP was 95.98% White, 0.55% African American, 0.07% Native American, 2.18% Asian, 0.02% Pacific Islander, 0.25% from other races, and 0.95% from two or more races. Hispanic or Latino of any race were 1.55% of the population.

There were 2,216 households, out of which 36.7% had children under the age of 18 living with them, 62.5% were married couples living together, 7.0% had a female householder with no husband present, and 28.6% were non-families. 24.8% of all households were made up of individuals, and 10.4% had someone living alone who was 65 years of age or older.  The average household size was 2.50 and the average family size was 3.02.

In the CDP, the population was spread out, with 27.3% under the age of 18, 3.7% from 18 to 24, 28.6% from 25 to 44, 25.7% from 45 to 64, and 14.6% who were 65 years of age or older.  The median age was 40 years. For every 100 females, there were 91.5 males.  For every 100 females age 18 and over, there were 84.2 males.

The median income for a household in the CDP was $72,639, and the median income for a family was $81,933. Males had a median income of $65,116 versus $41,250 for females. The per capita income for the CDP was $34,837.  About 0.4% of families and 1.9% of the population were below the poverty line, including 0.6% of those under age 18 and 4.8% of those age 65 or over.

References

Simsbury, Connecticut
Census-designated places in Hartford County, Connecticut
Neighborhoods in Connecticut
Census-designated places in Connecticut